Ameinias or Aminias was a younger brother of the playwright Aeschylus and of a hero of the battle of Marathon named Cynaegirus. He also had a sister, named Philopatho, who was the mother of the Athenian tragic poet Philocles. His father was Euphorion. Ameinias was from the Attica deme of Pallene according to Herodotus, or of that of Decelea according to Plutarch. He distinguished himself at the battle of Salamis as a trireme commander. His brother Aeschylus also fought at the battle.

According to Diodorus Siculus, Ameinias was the first to ram the flagship of the Persians, sinking it and killing the admiral. Herodotus writes that Athenians said that Ameinias charged one of the enemy vessels and his ship was entangled in combat and his men were not being able to get away, so the other Greek ships joined in the fight to assist Ameinias and this is how the battle started, but the Aeginetans say that one of their ships was the first to attack the Persian fleet.
He also pursued the ship of Artemisia, and she escaped by ramming and sinking the ship of her ally Damasithymos. When Ameinias saw that he thought that her ship was Greek and he changed the direction of his Trireme to chase other Persian ships.

Herodotus believed that Ameinias didn't know that Artemisia was on the ship because otherwise he would not have ceased his pursuit until either he had captured her or had been captured himself because orders had been given to the Athenian captains. Moreover, a prize had been offered of ten thousand drachmas for the man who should take her alive, since they thought it intolerable that a woman should lead an expedition against Athens.

In addition, according to Plutarch, Ameinias and the Socles of Pallene were the men who killed Ariamenes (Herodotus says that his name was Ariabignes), brother of Xerxes and admiral of the Persian navy. When Ariamenes attempted to board their ship, they hit him with their spears and thrust him into the sea.

Ameinias and Eumenes of Anagyrus (Anagyrus is the modern Vari) were judged to have been the bravest on this occasion among all the Athenians. Aelian mentions that Ameinias prevented the condemnation of his brother Aeschylus by the Areopagus.

See also

References

Sources

Athenians of the Greco-Persian Wars
Battle of Salamis
5th-century BC Athenians
Ancient Greek military personnel